Gerry Coone (born 1951 in Mullagh, County Galway) is an Irish former sportsperson.  He played hurling with his local club Mullagh and was a member of the Galway senior inter-county team in the 1970s.

References

1951 births
Living people
Mullagh hurlers
Galway inter-county hurlers
Connacht inter-provincial hurlers